Jeffrey Segal (born 27 April 1985 in Philadelphia, Pennsylvania) is an American racing driver who competes in the United SportsCar Championship for Michael Shank Racing. He is a two-time Rolex Sports Car Series GT class champion and winner of the 2014 24 Hours of Daytona in GT Daytona.

Ferrari Challenge
Segal became the youngest race winner in Ferrari Challenge history at the age of 17. He competed in multiple events prior to becoming a driver coach for a number of teams.

Rolex Sports Car Series
In 2003, Segal made his series debut, finishing third in the GT class at Virginia International Raceway driving a Ferrari of Washington Ferrari 360 GT.

After making select starts from 2004–07, Segal stepped up to full-time competition in 2008, claiming the GT class pole and win in the Sahlen's Six Hours of The Glen in a SpeedSource Mazda RX-8. He scored seven top-10 finishes that year.

The 2009 season saw continued success, with wins at Watkins Glen and Miller Motorsports Park and one additional podium finish.

In 2010, Segal won the GT Championship with two wins and ten consecutive top-four finishes, as well as a pole position at the Rolex 24 at Daytona. He shared the title with co-driver Emil Assentato in the No. 69 AIM Autosport Mazda RX-8. Segal finished fifth in the GT points standings in 2011, scoring eleven top-10 finishes in the SpeedSource Mazda.

Segal earned his second GT Championship in three years, teaming again with Assentato for three class wins in AIM Autosport's Ferrari 458 Italia Grand Am for the 2012 title. He finished sixth in the GT standings in 2013, which included a class victory at Indianapolis.

Continental Tire SportsCar Challenge
Segal joined Automatic Racing for two GS races in 2005, prior to an eighth-place finish in the GS points the following year, with three podiums in nine races and a best finish of second.

In 2007, Segal won the CTSC championship with Jep Thorton in an Automatic Racing BMW, becoming the then-youngest series champion at the age of 22, with four podiums and nine top-10s.

The following year, Segal earned his first career victory at Lime Rock Park, having recorded seven top-10s in nine starts.

United SportsCar Championship
Segal won the 2014 24 Hours of Daytona in the No. 555 Level 5 Motorsports Ferrari 458 Italia GT3 with co-drivers Scott Tucker, Townsend Bell, Bill Sweedler and Alessandro Pier Guidi, despite the car having initially been handed a penalty for late-race avoidable contact. IMSA reversed the call more than four hours after the race, declaring the No. 555 car the winners in GTD.

He will switch to Michael Shank Racing in 2017, where he will drive an Acura NSX GT3.

Personal life
Segal is a graduate of the University of Miami with a degree in Business Administration, specializing in Entrepreneurship. He is fluent in French and proficient in Spanish and enjoys biking and shifterkart racing in his free time.

24 Hours of Le Mans results

Complete WeatherTech SportsCar Championship results
(key) (Races in bold indicate pole position; results in italics indicate fastest lap)

References

External links

1985 births
Living people
Racing drivers from Philadelphia
Rolex Sports Car Series drivers
24 Hours of Daytona drivers
24 Hours of Le Mans drivers
American Le Mans Series drivers
University of Miami Business School alumni
FIA World Endurance Championship drivers
WeatherTech SportsCar Championship drivers
GT World Challenge America drivers
Extreme Speed Motorsports drivers
Level 5 Motorsports drivers
Meyer Shank Racing drivers
AF Corse drivers